Reunion is a resort and master-planned community located within Four Corners in Osceola County, Florida, near Walt Disney World Resort. Developed by Bobby Ginn and the Ginn Family, owner and developer of several resort communities throughout the World. The Ginn Family also owned the NASCAR team (formed by Thomas Ginn) called Ginn Racing (Merged with Dale Earnhardt Inc or DEI for short), Reunion is part of the Orlando–Kissimmee Metropolitan Statistical Area.
The resort presents an upscale vacation community for short-term guests and long-term residents; and includes comprehensive leisure facilities, restaurants, clubhouse and  private water park.

Golfing
Reunion Resort has three PGA golf courses, each individually designed by and named for Jack Nicklaus, Tom Watson and Arnold Palmer. The Resort hosted the Ginn Open, an LPGA Tour event, from 2006 to 2008.

Amenities 
Reunion Resort has several upscale amenities such as a  water park with a winding lazy river, two-story water slide and children's interactive play area. Reunion has a spa, a tennis complex, biking and walking trails as well as a fitness center and fitness programs.

Reunion Resort is currently owned and operated by Kingwood International Resorts.

Accommodations
Reunion Resort's portfolio of luxury real estate comprises condominiums and estate homes, many of which are offered as short stay vacation rentals directly from the resort or via independent owners and property managers. A smaller number of properties are occupied as permanent residencies.
The Bear's Den Park is a Jack Nicklaus-branded recent addition to the resort, offering two additional gated subdivisions within the golf community. Phase 2 of the Bear's Den Park is deed restricted as residential only, the first of its kind within Reunion Resort.

Reunion on TV
The Big Break VII: Reunion at Reunion aired on the Golf Channel in 2007 and featured competitors from past seasons competing for PGA and LPGA tour exemptions at Ginn Reunion Resort.

See also 

 Celebration, Florida, an adjacent master planned community in Osceola County
 The Reunion Resort Unofficial Blog, Dedicated Unofficial Blog for Reunion Resort's homeowners and members

References 

 
The Walt Disney Company
New Urbanism communities
Greater Orlando
Utopian communities in the United States
Tourist attractions in Osceola County, Florida
Golf clubs and courses in Florida
Planned communities in Florida